Kane is a fictional character in the alternate history universe of Westwood Studios' and Electronic Arts' Command & Conquer real-time strategy video games. A recurring antagonistic character in the Command & Conquer franchise with his first appearance in 1995's eponymous title, Kane has appeared in all main series Command & Conquer titles as the charismatic mastermind behind the secretive Brotherhood of Nod society, a quasi-religious terrorist organization.

Kane also appears in the 1996 game Command & Conquer: Red Alert, a prequel set before the first game in which he is observed to be acting as an advisor for USSR leader Joseph Stalin during an alternate World War II fought between the Allies and the Soviet Union. Within series lore, Kane disappears from the political scene after Stalin's assassination in this timeline, re-emerging in the 1990s to lead the Brotherhood of Nod in an ongoing conflict with the Global Defense Initiative, a multinational military force backed by the United Nations. The conflict between the factions throughout the series is depicted as long periods of cold war punctuated by periods of brief but violent military combat on a global scale. Kane's last appearance is in the 2010 Tiberium Twilight, in which he and his followers were last seen entering the extraterrestrial Threshold 19 tower.

The character has been portrayed by Joseph D. Kucan in all media. The character became a highly popular character with players since the inception of the Command & Conquer franchise in 1995. Kane has overall been well received, earning praise from several independent reviewers and a place in the Guinness Book of Records.

Character development
Kane is portrayed by Las Vegas-based actor Joseph D. Kucan, who also handled directing the FMV cutscenes for all C&C games, with the exception of more recent installments - these were handled by EA in-house cinematic director Richard Taylor. According to Kucan, The Brotherhood of Nod was an invention of original C&C designer Eydie Laramore, and that he spent an extended amount of time discussing biblical metaphor and imagined backstory with her for the faction and his character.

Story

World War II
Although the first published game in which the character appeared was the initial Command & Conquer in 1995, Kane's first chronological appearance was as an obscure counsellor to Joseph Stalin during the Soviet Union's invasion of Europe in the 1996 prequel Command & Conquer: Red Alert, the story of which is placed nearly half a century before the events of the original C&C game. Kane proved to be the concealed mastermind behind the actions of Joseph Stalin and thus the Soviet Union, and appeared to have instigated the world war between the Soviets and the Allies in order to further the Brotherhood of Nod's long-term goals. This was done with the aid of a woman known as Nadia—the head of the NKVD, Stalin's mistress and evidently a member of the Brotherhood herself as early as the 1950s. In Red Alert'''s alternative ending the USSR's conquest of Europe was completed, which would swiftly result in Stalin's assassination at the hands of Nadia, and her revealing the name of Kane as well as the existence of the Brotherhood of Nod to the player. Nadia then proceeded to reveal that Nod planned to continue to dwell in the shadows for several decades still, to openly emerge sometime "in the early 1990s". Kane however shoots her without warning upon those revelations, and the cutscene closes with the character stating the foreboding words to the player; "Comrade Chairman, I am the future". Kane apparently then disappears after the ending of Red Alert for five decades.

First Tiberium War
His reappearance literally marked the beginning of a new age. Under his direction, the now emerged Brotherhood of Nod began researching the alien substance of Tiberium almost immediately after its arrival on Earth through a meteorite impact in the year 1995, stating that it had the potential to bring about the next stage in humanity's evolution. Under the guidance of Kane, Nod gained a near monopoly on the world's rapidly increasing Tiberium supply, as the Brotherhood's technologies for harvesting Tiberium initially were the only viable method of extracting the crystals, giving them enormous amounts of capital in a relatively short period of time and causing Nod to pioneer unique Tiberium-based technology in virtually every field. Kane himself is believed to have invented these technologies, which are frequently referred to by his many followers worldwide as "The Technology of Peace". The period in which these events transpired, which would increasingly come to be known as the First Tiberium War, was marked by the Brotherhood of Nod openly starting to preach to many third world nations to throw off their "shackles of slavery" under more industrialized countries, while at the same time preaching an ideology of a Tiberium revolution to the entire world.  Many would begin to sign up for Nod's utopian vision of global prosperity and peace for the human race by embracing Tiberium and the unifying ways of the Brotherhood, rendered blind to the implications of Nod's mantra "Peace through Power". For all these actions, Kane quickly rose to the top of the most wanted list of the United Nations' newly instituted Global Defense Initiative task force, as the war between the GDI and the Brotherhood would eventually escalate into one of the most brutal conflicts in human history.

The end of this war saw a GDI strike force lay siege to Kane's Temple and the main base of operations in Sarajevo, which would lead to the Brotherhood of Nod's first apparent downfall. Reports of Kane's demise were inconsistent; some say he was buried underneath rubble when the Temple started to fall apart, but other sources stated that the Global Defense Initiative's ion cannon firing upon the main Temple structure killed Kane—indeed, a security video eventually substantiated this story. In it, Kane is seen embracing the light of the ion beam seconds before the Temple exploded under its force. However, his body was never found.

Second Tiberium War
Despite the Brotherhood's defeat at the end of the First Tiberium War, Kane's followers never wavered in their devotion and always believed that he lived in death, and were vindicated when he rose again in Command & Conquer: Tiberian Sun almost thirty years later to once again lead waiting Nod forces worldwide and begin a new open war with the GDI. Although he appeared to his followers during a ceremony with a flawless face, looking virtually the same as during the events shown in Red Alert and the First Tiberium War, his real appearance was less aesthetically pleasing—almost half of his head was covered by a metal plate, obscuring the massive burns presumably inflicted by the GDI ion cannon strike thirty years ago. He focused Nod's efforts on Tiberium weapons research anew, resulting in the development of a world-altering missile. The missile's launch was foiled by a daring GDI assault under the command of Michael McNeil, who ignored his superior's orders to refrain from the attack in order to allow GDI more time to plan and prepare for the deciding conflict. Kane was confronted by McNeil within his pyramid near Cairo and was impaled by him on a piece of metallic debris, which would result in the Brotherhood of Nod's second defeat.

During the subsequent events portrayed in Tiberian Sun: Firestorm, an unholy alliance was formed between GDI and the remaining Nod forces to stop the rogue actions of Nod's advanced AI system known as "CABAL". After the final defeat of CABAL and his cyborg forces, the Nod ending shows Kane's dormant body hooked into the CABAL system core and being kept alive in a cryonic capsule, apparently recovering from his grave injury sustained at the end of the second conflict at the hands of Michael McNeil. The screen of the AI's system core is shown to be continually splicing between the CABAL entity and Kane, as a single individual, with both of them referring to Kane's "vision" with disjointed voices, yet with Kane referring to it in the first person using the word "my" whereas CABAL refers to it with the word "your" in an almost respectful manner. Suddenly only CABAL's voice can be heard, and the last words spoken by the continued union of Kane and the AI are "Our directives must be reassessed".

Third Tiberium War
At the advent of the Third Tiberium War, seventeen years afterwards, Kane made his second re-appearance to the world, rallying waiting and prepared Nod forces everywhere anew and promptly initiating an overly aggressive attack on GDI by taking out their control centre for space defences, and subsequently annihilating the organization's orbital command station GDSS Philadelphia with a nuclear missile. Although the worldwide assault on GDI's installations which followed suit was successful and Nod did at one point very nearly achieve a complete military victory over the disorganized and reeling Global Defense Initiative, GDI would manage to turn the tide on them after weeks of fierce urban warfare, a turn of events Kane apparently had anticipated.  Kane had knowledge that a liquid Tiberium explosion of tremendous magnitude would attract the attention of an alien species known as the Scrin. Through the war he had initiated, Kane successfully provoked and lured GDI into attacking his main "Temple Prime" complex in retaliation to the Brotherhood of Nod's brutal assault on GDI-protected blue zones across the world. The plot worked, as under the order of Acting Director Redmond Boyle the ion cannon was fired directly upon "Temple Prime" in Sarajevo in an eerie repetition of historical events, which  detonated a liquid Tiberium deposit purposely hidden deep underneath the Temple Prime and causing a cataclysmic explosion across south-eastern Europe.

Soon after the detonation, the alien Scrin arrived on Earth in order to begin large-scale harvesting of the world's Tiberium deposits. Kane's apparent purpose in bringing them to Earth was to gain access to their highly advanced technology, as he thought to use the monolithic "Threshold" towers the extraterrestrials constructed to bring him and his followers to reach "ascension". As explained in the campaigns, the towers were vulnerable to assault and destruction while under construction, but once completed would partially phase out of existence, rendering them immune to all known human weaponry. To prevent the Scrin from completing construction of the towers GDI forces utilized their ion cannons to strike at the towers in order bring them down before their construction was completed, however, Nod loyalists in Italy would eventually manage to secure one of these gigantic structures (later identified as "Threshold 19") under Kane's guidance, placing it under the Brotherhood's control. During the Scrin campaign in Command & Conquer 3: Tiberium Wars, it is revealed that the alien species quickly became aware their premature awakening was a deliberate act by someone or something on Earth. After intercepting a transmission between Kane and the Nod commander (the player), they immediately focused their attention on Kane as the possible cause of this unprecedented incident, coming to the conclusion that the being of "Kane" somehow already existed in their master data matrix, and more disturbingly, that Kane's genetic material is unrecognizable even to the vast ancient knowledge of their space-faring species.

Five years after this third world war, an artificial intelligence named "LEGION" arises, with Kane promptly placing a secret army of cyborg soldiers known as the "Marked of Kane" under the entity's command in order to reclaim the mysterious Tacitus device from GDI's Cheyenne Mountain Complex. Soon after, the Marked launch an unrelenting assault on the heavily fortified military research complex, overrunning GDI's finest defenses and obtaining the Tacitus for Nod once again. The final cutscene, titled "Ascendance", shows Kane inserting the object into LEGION while proclaiming: "LEGION, my child, you are my greatest creation. It is time for you to take center stage; time for you to achieve the purpose for which you were created! One Vision, One Purpose!" With this, the story of Command & Conquer 3 concludes with a major cliffhanger.

Fourth Tiberium WarCommand & Conquer 4: Tiberian Twilight covers Kane's effort to bring the Scrin Threshold Tower to operational condition. At this point, most of the Earth had been overrun with Tiberium, and the failure to develop a solution to the Tiberium poisoning had rendered the Earth almost uninhabitable to Carbon-based life. Due to the failure of scientists to determine an effective way to contain Tiberium, the scientific community had predicted that humanity faced a very real threat of extinction due to the ongoing spread of the substance. In the midst of this crisis, Kane re-emerged and presented himself to GDI officials with a proposal to join his Brotherhood of Nod and the UN's Global Defense Initiative to allow for the construction of a Tiberium Control Network (TCN) that would inhibit the spread of Tiberium across the globe with the alternative purposes of furthering Kane's goal of ascension. While moderate GDI and Nod factions agreed to work together on the network, hardliners splintered off and began to assault each other, precipitating the 4th Tiberium War. Despite the conflict, Kane was able to finish the Tiberium Control Network and wire it into Threshold 19, completing the preparations needed to bring it back online. At the end of Tiberian Twilight, Kane convinces Commander Parker, the protagonist, to activate a portal in the Tower and enters, along with his Brotherhood followers, seemingly leaving Earth.

In the aftermath of the apparent departure of Kane and his followers via Threshold 19 it is revealed that the Tiberium Control Network jointly constructed by Nod and GDI has successfully contained the spread of Tiberium. More importantly, the TCN had caused Tiberium to recede in certain places, allowing for some of the formally designated red-zones that are regarded as too toxic to sustain carbon based life to be reclassified as yellow zones that can support human or other carbon based life forms.

Promotion 
Kane was the subject of a promotional website dedicated entirely to the character, and was the central focus of the storyline of Command & Conquer 3s expansion pack, entitled "Kane's Wrath", which expanded Kane's background, history and motives. 

On June 5, 2020, a video of Kucan reprising his role as Kane was uploaded to the official Command & Conquer YouTube channel to promote the release of Command & Conquer Remastered Collection. Kucan last appeared as Kane in Tiberian Twilight.

Reception
The character was well received by critics and fans alike. In 1998, Kane was ranked fifth on GameSpot's list of the best game villains as "one of the most vile characters you'll ever butt heads with in any PC game". GameSpy placed him tenth in their 2001 list of top villains in games, commenting he "generally makes your life a living hell". GameDaily ranked Kane as the eighth top evil mastermind of all time, praising him for his determination and intelligence despite being "a little bit on the nutty side". In 2008, Joe Martin of Bit-tech ranked Kane as the fifth top PC game NPC of all time, naming Kucan's "legendarily melodramatic" portrayal, the character's "sheer charisma", and its aura of mystery for the reasons why Kane "is one of the most long-toothed and loved villains of PC gaming". In 2008, Kucan was inducted in the Guinness World Records Gamer's Edition as the longest recurring actor in any video game franchise to date for his portrayal of Kane. 

In 2010, GamePro ranked him 43rd on the list of top most diabolical video game villains of all time. In 2011, Empire ranked him as 31st among the greatest video game characters as "one brilliant bad guy, and one of the most entertaining masterminds ever to scheme an evil scheme", noting that Kucan "was recently on the receiving end of a Guinness World Record nod for longest-running actor in any video game franchise". In a 2012 article, Joe Keiser from IGN described Kane as "arguably the most iconic live-action character in the history of gaming." GamesRadar staff also praised Kane's role as a charismatic antagonist, putting him in their 2013 list of the best villains in video game history at number 25, and at number 20 in an updated 2018 list. In a 2021 list published by PC Gamer'' staff, Kane is ranked among the most iconic characters in PC gaming.

References

Further reading

Command & Conquer
Fictional criminals in video games
Fictional commanders
Fictional dictators
Dictator characters in video games
Fictional cult leaders
Fictional mass murderers
Fictional warlords in video games
Male characters in video games
Male video game villains
Science fiction video game characters
Strategy video game characters
Fictional terrorists
Video game antagonists
Video game characters introduced in 1995

sv:Command & Conquer (spelserie)#Kane